The origins of the surname Bolling: 
English: from a nickname for someone with close-cropped hair or a large head, Middle English bolling "pollard", or for a heavy drinker, from Middle English bolling "excessive drinking". 
German (Bölling): from a pet form of a personal name formed with Germanic bald "bold", "brave" (see Baldwin). 
Swedish: either an ornamental name composed of Boll + the suffix -ing "belonging to", or possibly a habitational name from a place named Bolling(e).  

Bolling may refer to:
Bolling, Alabama
Bolling Air Force Base, Washington, D.C.

People with the surname
Alexander R. Bolling (1895–1964), U.S. Army officer
Bill Bolling (born 1957), Lieutenant Governor of Virginia
Bruce Bolling (1945–2012), first black president of the Boston City Council 
Claude Bolling (1930–2020), French jazz pianist
Edith Bolling Galt Wilson (1872–1961), second wife of Woodrow Wilson
Eric Bolling (born 1963), financial news and political television personality
Frank Bolling (1931–2020), American baseball second baseman
John Bolling, (1676–1729), early American colonist, farmer, and politician 
Julian Bolling, (born 1966), Sri Lankan swimmer
Landrum Bolling (1913–2018), American educator and diplomat
Leslie Garland Bolling (1898–1955), an African-American sculptor from Virginia
Milt Bolling (1930–2013), American baseball infielder and brother of Frank Bolling
Phillip S. Bolling (1849–1892), African-American politician and former slave
Raynal Bolling (1877–1918), U.S. Army officer
Richard Walker Bolling (1916–1991), American politician
Robert Bolling (1646–1709), early American colonist and Jane Rolfe's husband 
Royal L. Bolling (1920–2002), Massachusetts politician, war hero
Ruben Bolling (born 1963), American cartoonist
Samuel P. Bolling (1819–1900), African-American politician and former slave
Spottswood Bolling, plaintiff in the Civil Rights lawsuit Bolling v. Sharpe (1954)
Tiffany Bolling (born 1947), American actress, model and singer
Tyra Bolling (born 1985), African-American singer, songwriter, and entrepreneur

See also
Bølling (disambiguation)
Boll, a German surname